This is a discography for Danny Kirwan, one of the lead guitarists in Fleetwood Mac from 1968 to 1972. From 1975 to 1979 he had a brief solo career.

With Fleetwood Mac

Albums
English Rose (Epic 1969 – US only)
The Pious Bird of Good Omen (Blue Horizon 1969 – UK only)
Then Play On (Reprise 1969)
Fleetwood Mac in Chicago/Blues Jam in Chicago, Vols. 1–2 (Blue Horizon 1969)
Kiln House (Reprise 1970)
Future Games (Reprise 1971)
Bare Trees (Reprise 1972)

Additional compilations and archival releases
Greatest Hits (CBS 1971 – compilation)
The Best of Fleetwood Mac (Reprise c1971 – Germany only but featuring rare songs)
The Hits of Fleetwood Mac (Columbia 1990 – compilation)
25 Years - The Chain [4-CD Box set] (Warner 1992)
Like It This Way (Elite – compilation)
The Vaudeville Years of Fleetwood Mac 1968 to 1970 [Box set] (Receiver 1998)
Show-Biz Blues 1968–1970 [Box set] (Receiver 2001 – Companion to "Vaudeville Years") 
The Complete Blue Horizon Sessions 1967–1969 [Box set] (Columbia UK, 1999)
The Best of Peter Green's Fleetwood Mac (Columbia 2002 – compilation)
Original Fleetwood Mac: The Blues Years (3-CD set, Castle, 2000)
Madison Blues [3 disc box-set] (Shakedown 2003 – recorded 1970–71)
Green Shadows (Union Square Music 2003 – compilation)
Black Magic Woman (Epic 2004 – compilation)
The Essential Fleetwood Mac (Sony BMG 2007 – 2CD compilation)

Live albums
Live at the BBC (Castle 1995 – recorded 1967–71)
Shrine '69 (Rykodisc 1999 – recorded 25 January 1969)
The Blues Collection (Castle, 1989 or 1992)
Live at the Boston Tea Party, vols 1–3 (recorded February 1970. Comprehensively released 1998 by Snapper Records, having previously been repackaged and bootlegged several times)
Jumping at Shadows: The Blues Years (released 2002)

Singles
"Albatross" / "Jigsaw Puzzle Blues" (Blue Horizon 01/1969)
"Man of the World" / "Somebody's Gonna Get Their Head Kicked In Tonite" (Immediate 04/1969)
"Oh Well (Part 1)" / "Oh Well (Part 2)" (Reprise 11/1969)
"The Green Manalishi (With the Two-Pronged Crown)" / "World in Harmony" (Reprise 05/1970)
"Dragonfly" / "The Purple Dancer" (Reprise 03/1971)

Fleetwood Mac singles released only in non-UK markets
"Rattlesnake Shake" / "Coming Your Way" (France, Germany, USA, Canada 1969)
"Jewel Eyed Judy" / "Station Man" (Germany, Netherlands, USA 1970)
"Tell Me All the Things You Do" / "This Is the Rock" (France 1970)
"Sands of Time" / "Lay It All Down" (USA 11/1971)
"Sentimental Lady" / "Sunny Side Of Heaven" (USA 05/1972)

"Albatross", "Need Your Love So Bad" and "Oh Well" were also re-released in various European markets with different B-sides.

"Somebody's Gonna Get Their Head Kicked in Tonight" was credited to 'Earl Vince and the Valiants', a sometime pseudonym of Fleetwood Mac while in 'Jeremy Spencer 50s mode'.

"Need Your Love So Bad" was recorded before Kirwan joined Fleetwood Mac, but he appeared in the black and white video clip for the song.

Danny Kirwan solo releases

Albums
Second Chapter (DJM 1975)
Midnight in San Juan (DJM 1976)
Danny Kirwan (DJM 1977 – US release of Midnight in San Juan)
Hello There Big Boy! (DJM 1979)
Ram Jam City (Mooncrest 2000 – recorded in the mid-1970s as demo tracks for the Second Chapter album)

Singles
Ram Jam City / Hot Summer Day (DJM 07/1975)
Misty River / Rolling Hills (DJM 05/1976)
Ram Jam City / Angel's Delight (DJM 1976 – UK only)
Second Chapter / Skip A Dee Doo (DJM 08/1976 – US only)
Hot Summer Day / Love Can Always Bring You Happiness (DJM 06/1977)
Let It Be / I Can Tell (DJM 08/1977 – US only)
Only You / Caroline (DJM 03/1979 – UK only)

Fleetwood Mac's "Man of the World" was also released in the UK with Danny Kirwan's "Second Chapter" on the B-side, both on the DJM label and on Epic. In the USA, Kirwan's "Best Girl in the World" was the B-side, this time only on DJM.

Other releases featuring Danny Kirwan
Otis Spann – The Biggest Thing Since Colossus (1969)
Tramp – Tramp (1969)
Clifford Davis – "Before the Beginning" / "Man of the World" (single – Blue Horizon 1969)
Clifford Davis – "Come On Down and Follow Me" / "Homework" (single – Blue Horizon 1970)
Christine Perfect – Christine Perfect (CBS 1970)
Christine Perfect – "When You Say" / "No Road Is the Right Road" (single – CBS 1970)
Jeremy Spencer – Jeremy Spencer (Reprise 1970)
Jeremy Spencer – "Linda" / "Teenage Darling" (single – Reprise 1970)
Chris Youlden – Nowhere Road (1973)
Tramp – Put a Record On (1974)
Jo Ann Kelly – Tramp 1974 (Mooncrest 2001 – Kirwan plays on 6 tracks recorded live in 1974)

Christine Perfect was Christine McVie's maiden name.

References
Fleetwood Mac Legacy
[ Allmusic discography] Allmusic's complete discography of Fleetwood Mac

Fleetwood Mac
Discographies of British artists
Blues discographies
Rock music discographies